Frantic is a 1988 American-French neo-noir mystery thriller film directed by Roman Polanski and starring Harrison Ford and Emmanuelle Seigner. Ennio Morricone composed the film score.

Although the film was a box office bomb and failed to cover its budget, it garnered critical praise.

Plot 
Dr. Richard Walker is a surgeon visiting Paris with his wife Sondra for a medical conference. At their hotel, she is unable to unlock her suitcase, and Walker determines that she picked up the wrong one at the airport. While Walker is taking a shower, Sondra receives a phone call that Walker can't hear and she mysteriously disappears from their hotel room.

Still jet-lagged, Walker searches for his wife in the hotel with the help of a polite but mostly indifferent staff and then wanders outside to look for her himself. A wino overhears him in a café and says he saw Sondra being forced into a car in a nearby alley. Walker is skeptical, until he finds his wife's ID bracelet on the cobblestones. He contacts the Paris police and the U.S. Embassy, but their responses are bureaucratic, and there is little hope anyone will bother looking for her.  As Walker carries on the search himself he stumbles onto a murder site where he encounters the streetwise young Michelle, who mistook Sondra's suitcase for her own at the airport. He realises that Michelle is a career drug smuggler, but does not care or know for which shady dealers she is hired.  Michelle reluctantly helps Walker in his  attempt to learn what was packed in her switched suitcase, and how to trade the contents for the return of his kidnapped wife.

Following their visit to Michelle's apartment, Walker's hotel room and shabby cabarets, it turns out that the smuggled contents are not drugs, but a krytron, an electronic switch used as a detonator for nuclear weapons, stolen and smuggled inside a souvenir replica of the Statue of Liberty, on orders of some Arab country's agents.  The American embassy, working with Israeli agents, wants to get hold of the precious device, and they have no problem letting Sondra die for it. In order to save his wife, Walker joins forces with Michelle, who is only interested in getting her paycheck.

The film ends with a confrontation on the Île aux Cygnes, in the middle of the Seine, next to the Paris Statue of Liberty replica there, where Sondra is to be released in exchange for the krytron. However, a gunfight ensues between the Arab agents who were to get the precious device, and the Israeli Mossad secret agents who traced them to get hold of it. The Arabs are killed in the crossfire but Michelle is hit too, dying soon after having slipped the krytron into Walker's pocket, with Sondra at their side.  Furious, Walker shows the krytron device to the Israeli agents, to throw it into the Seine.  He carries Michelle's body away, ready to leave Paris with his wife.

Cast

Production

Filming 
Filming took place on location in Paris with exteriors filmed outside Le Grand Hotel in rue Scribe in the 9th arrondissement. The hotel's lobby also appeared in the film.
Filming also took place at the Île aux Cygnes island in the Seine for the Lady Liberty scenes.

Release 
Frantic was released in the UK on 16 February 1988, with a release of 26 February in the US and a 30 March release in France. Also was released on DVD Juny 01, 2004 in Region 1.

Reception

Box office
The film was a disappointment at the box office with a domestic gross of $17,637,950, failing to recoup its production budget. However, the film was more successful in other countries such as France where it received 1,293,721 admissions.

Critical reception
Although a commercial failure in the US, Frantic was a critical success. Review aggregator Rotten Tomatoes reported that 76% of critics gave positive reviews based on a sample of 42 reviews with an average rating of 6.4/10. The site's consensus simply calls it "A tense, on-point thriller in the vein of Polanski's earlier work". Metacritic calculated an average score of 66 out of 100 based on 16 reviews, indicating "generally favorable reviews". Audiences polled by CinemaScore gave the film an average grade of "B-" on an A+ to F scale.

The film received "two thumbs up" from Gene Siskel and Roger Ebert on their television programme Siskel & Ebert and The Movies. Roger Ebert, in his review, gave the film three out of four stars, saying: "to watch the opening sequences of Frantic is to be reminded of Polanski's talent. Here is one of the few modern masters of the thriller and the film noir. Frantic is a reminder of how absorbing a good thriller can be."

Pat Collins of WWOR-TV called it "Polanski's best film ever". Desson Howe, of The Washington Post, called the movie "vintage Polanski", with its relentless paranoia, irony, diffident strangers and nutty cameos. British film magazine Empire rated the movie three out five, calling it Polanski's most satisfying film since Chinatown, and one of the best traditional thrillers to come down the pike in quite some time.

References

External links 
 
 
 
 
 Frantic at Yahoo! Movies

1988 films
American mystery thriller films
1980s English-language films
1980s French-language films
Films about missing people
Films directed by Roman Polanski
Films set in Paris
Films shot in Paris
Warner Bros. films
Films scored by Ennio Morricone
Films with screenplays by Robert Towne
Films with screenplays by Gérard Brach
Films with screenplays by Roman Polanski
Films about vacationing
American neo-noir films
1980s mystery thriller films
1988 multilingual films
American multilingual films
1980s American films